K141 may refer to:

 Russian submarine Kursk (K-141), lost at sea in 2000
 HMCS Summerside (K141), a Canadian Royal Navy corvette
 K-141 (Kansas highway), United States, a road